Various research and polling firms conducted opinion polling before the 2019 federal election in individual electorates across Australia, in relation to voting intentions in the Australian House of Representatives.

New South Wales

Victoria

Queensland

See also
 Opinion polling for the 2019 Australian federal election

References
Notes

Citations

Opinion polling, electorate
2019
Australia